Tom Kubis is an American jazz musician and arranger.

A native of Los Angeles, Kubis started a big band to play his arrangements. He has also written arrangements for Bill Watrous and the BBC Radio Big Band.

He studied 20th century composition at Long Beach State University and worked in television with Steve Allen, Helen Reddy, Jackie Gleason, and Bob Newhart. During the 1960s, he played flute and saxophone with Louie Bellson, Pete Christlieb, Frank Rosolino, Arturo Sandoval, Jack Sheldon, and Bill Watrous.

His arrangements were featured at the Kennedy Center in Washington, D.C in a presentation written by Cy Coleman and Alan and Marilyn Bergman. In 1993, Kubis conducted his arrangements with Jack Sheldon at Carnegie Hall. His arrangements have been performed at the Playboy Jazz Festival, the Montreux Jazz Festival, and the Berkeley Jazz Festival. His big band performed at the Orange County Performing Arts Center with the Pacific Symphony Orchestra.

Discography

As leader
 Slightly Off the Ground, (Sea Breeze, 1989)
 At Last, (Cexton, 1992)
 It's Not Just for Christsmas Anymore (Cexton, 1995)
 Fast Cars & Fascinating Women (Sea Breeze, 1996)
 You Just Can't Have Enough Christmas (Cexton, 1997)
 Keep Swingin'  (Sea Breeze, 1997)
 A Jazz Musician's Christmas, (Sea Breeze, 2002)
 Christmas III (Cexton, 2002)
 Live & Unleashed at Don the Beachcomber (Tom Kubis, 2013)

As sideman
 Andy Martin, Vic Lewis, The Project (Drewbone, 2004)
 Jack Sheldon, JSO Live on the Pacific Ocean (Jadi/Butterfly, 2001)
 Jack Sheldon, Sunday Afternoons at the Lighthouse (Woofy, 2005)

References

External links
 Official site

1951 births
Living people
American jazz bandleaders
American jazz pianists
American male pianists
Grammy Award winners
Musicians from Los Angeles
20th-century American pianists
Jazz musicians from California
21st-century American pianists
20th-century American male musicians
21st-century American male musicians
American male jazz musicians